Spraycan Art is the first book that documented the initial stages of the worldwide spread of New York City Subway graffiti style and subculture. Authored by Henry Chalfant and James Prigoff and published by Thames & Hudson on September 1, 1987. The photographs are primarily of walls rather than subway cars, and features the work of Mode 2 and The Chrome Angelz, 3D (aka Robert Del Naja, of the band Massive Attack), Goldie, Bando, Futura, Lee, Chico, Tracy 168, Buda, Shame, Blade, Seen, Stash, Reas (aka Todd James), Espo (aka Stephen Powers) and many others.  

Spraycan Art followed the release of Subway Art (also published by Thames & Hudson), authored by Henry Chalfant and Martha Cooper.

References

1987 non-fiction books
Books about New York City
Graffiti in the United States
Collaborative non-fiction books
Thames & Hudson books